The 2009–10 Murray State Racers men's basketball team represented Murray State University in the 2009–10 college basketball season. This was head coach Billy Kennedy's fourth season at Murray State. The Racers competed in the Ohio Valley Conference and played their home games at the Regional Special Events Center, also known simply as the RSEC. They finished the season 31–5, 17–1 in OVC play to capture the regular season championship. They also won the 2010 Ohio Valley Conference men's basketball tournament to earn the conference's automatic bid to the 2010 NCAA Division I men's basketball tournament. They earned a 13 seed in the West Region where they upset 4 seed and AP #21 Vanderbilt in the first round before losing to 5 seed and AP #11 Butler in the second round.

Roster
Source

Schedule and results

|-
!colspan=9 style=| Exhibition

|-
!colspan=9 style=| Regular season

|-
!colspan=9 style=| OVC tournament

|-
!colspan=10 style=| NCAA tournament

References

Murray State
Murray State
Murray State Racers men's basketball seasons